Penina Davidson (born 2 September 1995) is a New Zealand professional basketball player.

College
Davidson played college basketball at the University of California, Berkeley, playing with the Golden Bears in the Pac-12 Conference of NCAA Division I.

Statistics 

|-
|2014–15
| align="left" |California
|34
|0
|11.8
|.455
|.400
|.500
|1.4
|0.3
|0.2
|0.1
|0.8
|3.3
|-
|2015–16
| align="left" |California
|32
|8
|22.8
|.475
|.219
|.467
|4.0
|0.8
|0.4
|0.8
|1.5
|5.7
|-
|2016–17
| align="left"|California
|33
|25
|22.8
|.476
|.286
|.596
|5.3
|1.0
|0.6
|0.9
|1.6
|6.5
|-
|2017–18
| align="left"|California
|32
|32
|24.8
|.480
|.250
|.661
|7.0
|0.7
|0.3
|0.7
|1.5
|7.4
|-
|Career
|
|131
|65
|20.4
|.474
|.286
|.574
|4.4
|0.7
|0.4
|0.6
|1.3
|5.7

Career

WNBL
In 2018, Davidson would make her professional debut after she was signed by the Adelaide Lightning for the 2018–19 WNBL season. There she was under head coach Chris Lucas, and played alongside the likes of Nia Coffey, Stephanie Blicavs and Lauren Nicholson, making a Finals appearance in her debut season.

In 2019, Davidson signed with the Melbourne Boomers for the 2019–20 season. In signing with the Boomers, Davidson joined several of her Tall Ferns teammates all playing under national team head coach, Guy Molloy.

In July 2020, Davidson signed to return to the Boomers for the 2020 hub season based in North Queensland.

National team

Youth level
Davidson made her international debut for the New Zealand under-17 team at the 2009 FIBA Oceania Under-16 Championship in Brisbane, Queensland, at just the age of 14. She would take home the Silver medal at the Under-16's in both 2009 and 2011. In 2012, Davidson represented NZ at the FIBA Oceania Under-18 Championship in Porirua, New Zealand.

Senior level
Davidson made her senior international debut with the Tall Ferns at the 2013 FIBA Oceania Championship. She has taken home the silver medal on two occasions. Purcell played for the Tall Ferns at the 2016 FIBA World Olympic Qualifying Tournament in Nantes, France. After losses to France and Cuba, New Zealand failed to qualify. Davidson also represented the Tall Ferns at the 2019 FIBA Asia Cup in Bangalore, India, where New Zealand placed fifth overall.

Personal life
Davidson has been open about her battles with bipolar disorder, and its affects on her playing, including periods of self-harming. She was hospitalized and after her diagnosis she has said that life became much easier.

References

1995 births
Living people
Forwards (basketball)
New Zealand women's basketball players
California Golden Bears women's basketball players
Adelaide Lightning players
Melbourne Boomers players
Basketball players from Auckland
People with bipolar disorder